Tridrepana rectifascia is a moth in the family Drepanidae. It was described by Allan Watson in 1957. It is found on Mindanao in the Philippines.

The wingspan is about 33-35.8 mm. Adults are similar to Tridrepana postica and Tridrepana argentistriga, but can be distinguished by the more strongly marked subterminal on the upperside of the forewings, the presence of a dark patch near the base of the underside of the forewing, and the presence of a distinctly clavate frenulum.

References

Moths described in 1957
Drepaninae
Moths of the Philippines